Worry is an unincorporated community in Burke County, in the U.S. state of North Carolina.

History
Worry was so named by its citizens who were worried after postal authorities had rejected their first choices for a town name. A post office was established as Worry in 1888, and remained in operation until it was discontinued in 1944.

References

Unincorporated communities in Burke County, North Carolina
Unincorporated communities in North Carolina